"How It's Done" is a song by American rapper Kash Doll, German singer Kim Petras, Finnish singer Alma and British rapper Stefflon Don. It was released on October 11, 2019, by Republic Records, as the second single from the soundtrack to the film Charlie's Angels, based on the television series of the same name created by Ivan Goff and Ben Roberts.

Background
American singer Ariana Grande revealed the tracklist of the then-upcoming Charlie's Angels: Original Motion Picture Soundtrack on her Twitter. "How It's Done" was made available for purchase upon pre-order. Petras said that she was thankful to be included on the soundtrack.

Critical reception
Shaad D'Souza of The Fader described the song as "an upbeat, vintage-sounding R&B track" and pointed out that it "showcases a new style for all four artists". Mike Nied at Idolator thought the track was "a predictably catchy anthem". MTV News described the song as "party-starting posse cut".

Credits and personnel
Credits adapted from Tidal:

 Alma – vocals, songwriting
 Kim Petras – vocals
 Stefflon Don – vocals, songwriting
 Kash Doll – vocals, songwriting
 Ariana Grande – vocals, songwriting
 Ilya – production, songwriting, programming, backing vocals, bass, drums, keyboards, percussion
 Savan Kotecha – songwriting, co-production
 Rami Yacoub – songwriting, production, programming, backing vocals, bass, horn arrangement, keyboards, percussion, string arrangement
 Michael Engström – bass
 Wojtek Goral – saxophone
 David Bukovinszky – cello
 Mattias Bylund – editing, record engineering, horn, horn arrangement, strings, string arrangement, synthesizing
 Cory Bice – record engineering
 Jeremy Lertola – record engineering
 Sam Holland – record engineering
 John Hanes – mixing engineering
 Serban Ghenea – mixing
 Wojtek Goral – saxophone, tenor saxophone
 Tomas Jonsson  – tenor saxophone
 Peter Noos Johansson – trombone
 Janne Bjerger – trumpet
 Magnus Johansson – trumpet
 Mattias Johansson – violin
 Aaron Joseph – vocal engineering, vocal production
 Kalle Keskikuru – vocal engineering
 Parker Ament – vocal engineering
 Rymez – vocal engineering

Release history

References

2019 singles
2019 songs
Kash Doll songs
Kim Petras songs
Stefflon Don songs
Songs written by Stefflon Don
Charlie's Angels (franchise)
Songs written for films
Songs written by Ariana Grande
Songs written by Ilya Salmanzadeh
Songs written by Rami Yacoub
Songs written by Savan Kotecha
Song recordings produced by Ilya Salmanzadeh
Song recordings produced by Rami Yacoub
Song recordings produced by Savan Kotecha
Songs written by Alma (Finnish singer)
Alma (Finnish singer) songs